Soyoung Yoon (born October 28, 1984 in Seoul, South Korea) is a South Korean violinist.  She started playing the violin at the age of five.  She plays on the 1710 King George Stradivarius and the 1773 ex-Bückeburg J.B. Guadagnini violin.

Yoon attended Yewon Middle School for Arts, Seoul Arts High School, Korea National University of Arts, Cologne University of Music, and Zurich University of the Arts, where she studied under Zakhar Bron.

Awards

 First prize, Henryk Wieniawski Violin Competition, 2011
 First prize, Yehudi Menuhin International Violin Competition, 2002
 First prize, Cologne International Music Competition, 2003
 Winner, Tibor Varga International Competition, 2005
 First prize, David Oistrakh International Violin Competition, Odessa, Ukraine, 2006
 Sixth prize, Queen Elisabeth Competition, 2009
 Silver medal, International Violin Competition of Indianapolis, 2010

References

External links 
 
 Biography

1984 births
Living people
South Korean classical violinists
Henryk Wieniawski Violin Competition prize-winners
21st-century classical violinists
Women classical violinists